Yadgar-i-Bahaduri ("The Memorial of Bahadur") is an Indian Persian language encyclopaedia of history, geography, science and art. Edited by Bahadur Singh, it was completed in 1834 CE in Lucknow.

Authorship and date 

Bahadur Singh was originally a resident of Gondiwal pargana in Shahjahanabad (otherwise known as Old Delhi). He was the son of Hazari Mal, who belonged to Bhatnagar clan of the Kayastha caste. He mentions that he was forced to leave Shahjahanbad due to circumstances, and arrived in Lucknow in 1817, under "great distress". At that time, Lucknow was ruled by Ghazi-ud-Din Haidar. At Lucknow, Bahadur Singh read several Hindi and Persian language works on history. He was inspired to write a connected history based on all these works. He finished the work on the first day of Ramazan in 1249 A.H. (12 January 1834 CE).

Bahadur Singh states that he has only copied content from other books, and organized it into an encyclopedia. But according to Charles Rieu he evidently added original content, especially on the later history of Awadh and Bengal. The detailed account of the Nawabs of Awadh, their families and their ministers is unique to this encyclopedia among other contemporary works.

For some reason, Bahadur Singh strongly resented Kashmiri people. In his book, Singh describes rape and murder of Kashmiri Hindus by Muslims over the centuries. He states that under Aurangzeb's rule, the total weight of sacred threads collected from Hindus forcibly converted to Islam was 10 seers. He further states that many of these later converted back to Hinduism. Singh's account does not aim to present Muslims as savages, rather to present Kashmiris as a group more degraded than mlecchas because of their illegitimacy. He urges other people to not only avoid Kashmiris, but destroy them. According to Christopher Bayly, as a lowly clerk, he was envious of the success of his Kashmiri rivals. Henry Miers Elliot suggests that he might have lost a job to a Kashmiri.

Contents 

The encyclopedia is divided into 4 books (Sanihah), which are further sub-divided into chapters (dastan).

Book I 

Information on prophets from Adam to Muhammad.

Book II

Book III 

 Philosophers of the world
 Greece and Europe (including Columbus and Copernicus)
 Persia and India
 Others (early Muslims and modern physicians)
 Companions of Muhammad
 Their successors (Tabi‘un and Tubba')
 Shaikhs of four types
 Sunnis
 Shias
 Sufis of Iran (mainly copied from Nafahat-ul-Uns)
 Hindu theosophists, devotees and their sects
 Ulama
 Poets and miscellaneous
 Celebrated Muslims not included in earlier sections

Book IV 

This book begins with an introduction (mukaddimah) of the Old World and the New World.

 The seven climes
 Countries and cities of the world:
 Muslim world
 Europe
 India, including separate accounts of the Mughal subahs (provinces)
 Islands of the world (including England)
 Americas

The introduction is followed by 8 chapters (fasls):

 Kings of Iran
 Kings of the Arabs
 Greek and Romans 
 Seljuks of Rum
 Osmanlis
 Rulers of Egypt and Sham (Syria)
 Pharaohs and kings of Israel
 Ikhshidis
 Seljuks and Atabaks of Syria
 Ayyubis and Mamluks
 Maghreb
 Seventeen dynasties, from the Umayyads of Spain to the Sharifs of Pez
 Sultans of Turkistan
 Kings of Europe
 Creeds, manners, and institutions of the Europeans
 including the British in India, their army, administration of justice, revenue, learning
 Rulers of Hindustan: its different provinces and inhabitants

Translations 

Munshi Sadasukh Lal partially translated Yadgar-i-Bahaduri into English. This translation appears in Henry Miers Elliot's History of India.

References 

1834 books
19th-century Indian books
Indian encyclopedias
Persian encyclopedias
19th-century encyclopedias